10,000 Gecs (stylized as 10,000 gecs or 10000 gecs) is the second studio album and major label debut by American hyperpop duo 100 Gecs. Following a 2021 tour to promote it, initial plans for release in early 2022, and numerous delays, the album was ultimately released on March 17, 2023.

Background
On July 13, 2021, 100 Gecs announced the 10000 Gecs Tour. The 34-date tour ran from October 8 through December 9. On this tour, the duo performed the then-unreleased songs "MeMeMe", "Hollywood Baby", "757", "Billy Knows Jamie", "One Million Dollars", "Hey Big Man", "Fallen 4 Ü", and "What's That Smell?". On September 6, they officially announced the album and revealed its cover art. Then, on October 7, they announced that it would release in early 2022. On November 19, they officially released "MeMeMe" as the album's first single. The album would ultimately miss the "early 2022" release window, however its second single, "Doritos & Fritos", was released on April 12, 2022. The duo also played another new song, "I Got My Tooth Removed", at some of their concerts during that year. On December 2, they released an EP titled Snake Eyes, which included the previously performed "Hey Big Man" as well as two other songs. The same day, they officially announced that 10,000 Gecs would release on March 17, 2023, and launched pre-orders for the album. On February 16, 2023, they released the album's third single "Hollywood Baby", along with the album's track listing. All of the new songs that the duo played live on tour, with the exception of "Hey Big Man", "Fallen 4 Ü", and "What's That Smell?", are on the album.

Reception 
According to review aggregator Metacritic, 10,000 Gecs received "universal acclaim".

Track listing

Personnel
100 Gecs
 Dylan Brady – production (all tracks), vocals (tracks 2–6, 8–10)
 Laura Les – production (all tracks), vocals (1–6, 8–10), guitar (1, 3–7, 9, 10)

Additional musicians
 Josh Freese – drums (3, 5–7, 9)
 DJ Final – scratching (6)
 Gabriel Steiner – trumpet (9)
 Alex Csillag – trombone (9)
 Aaron Leibowitz – saxophone (9)

Technical
 Chris Gehringer – mastering
 Mark "Spike" Stent – mixing (1, 4)
 Jeff Ellis – mixing (2, 3, 5–10)

Artwork
 Chris Maggio – creative direction, photography
 Tracy Ma – graphic design
 Mikey Joyce – logo
 Elly Golterman – costume designer

References

100 Gecs albums
2023 albums
Albums produced by 100 Gecs
Albums produced by Dylan Brady